Chisocheton pentandrus is a tree in the family Meliaceae. The specific epithet  is from the Greek meaning "five man", referring to the five stamens of each flower.

Description
The bark is greenish grey. The flowers are fragrant and cream-coloured.

Distribution and habitat
Chisocheton pentandrus is found in Thailand and Malesia.

References

pentandrus
Trees of Thailand
Trees of Malesia
Plants described in 1905
Taxa named by Francisco Manuel Blanco